Robert Bober (born 1931) is a French film director, theater director and writer of German-Jewish origin. He was born on November 17, 1931 in Berlin. Working as a film-maker for television since 1967, he has made close to 120 documentary films. His first novel, Quoi de neuf sur la guerre? (What's new about war?) received the Prix du Livre Inter in 1994.

Early life

Robert Bober was born in Berlin in 1931 to Jewish parents of Polish origin. In 1933 the family flees Nazism and takes refuge in France. Thanks to an early warning, the family managed to avoid the Velodrome d'Hiver roundup of July 1942, where many Jews were killed or deported. At 16, he began an apprenticeship as a tailor and made a living that way until the age of 22 when he turned to pottery. During his summer vacations he spent time with children who had lost their families during the Second World War.

Career

In the 1950s, Bober met François Truffaut and became his assistant for the films 400 Blows (1959), Shoot the Piano Player (1960), and Jules and Jim (1962). In 1967 he directed his first documentary for TV. During the 1960s and 1970s his documentaries primarily explored the consequences of the Holocaust.

In 1979 he collaborated with Georges Perec on a documentary film called Ellis Island Revisited, also published in book form.

Bober has published 4 novels with the French publisher P.O.L.: Quoi de neuf sur la guerre (1993), Berg et Beck (1999), Laissées-pour-compte (2005) and On ne peut plus dormir tranquille quand on a une fois ouvert les yeux (translated as Wide Awake) (2010). Of these novels, only Wide Awake has been translated into English. It was published by The New Press.

References

Sources
 Short biography

Jewish emigrants from Nazi Germany to France
Living people
1931 births
French documentary filmmakers
French film directors
Prix du Livre Inter winners
Chevaliers of the Ordre des Arts et des Lettres